Shang Zhen (Shang Chen, 商震, 1887–1978) was a general of the National Revolutionary Army during the Warlord Era, Second Sino-Japanese War and World War II.  He was an early 20th century field general who won his share of wars and successful retreats.  He then represented China's military in Washington and other international settings during World War II and post war Japan.

Brief Biography

 Born September 21, 1888, Hebei Baoding
 Died May 15, 1978, Japan
 Education, Baoding Army Officer Academy 保定陆军军官学校
1905 joined Tonmenghui (Allied League 同盟会), predecessor of kuomintang 国民党.
Profession, 3 star general, Republic of China
Campaigns, Central Plains Campaign 中原大战, Northern Expedition, Wuhan war Campign 武汉会战, Civil War 国共内战
Military attache, Washington D.C., 1944-45.
Head of Military Mission, Chinese Occupation delegate to Allied Council in Japan, 1946-49.
Retired and died in Japan.

Early Career Warlord Period 

Governor of Suiyuan Province from 1927 to 1928. He became Chairman of the Government of Hebei Province and Commander of the Peiping & Tientsin Garrison from 1928 to 1929 following the success of the Northern Expedition to unify China. From 1929 to 1930 during the Central Plains War he was Chairman of the Government of Shanxi Province.  In 1931 he became the General commanding 4th Army. Then from 1931 to 1935 he commanded 32nd Army, defeating the Chahar People's Anti-Japanese Army near Peiking in October 1933. Again in 1935 he was made Chairman of the Government of Hebei Province. In 1935 he became Chairman of the Government of Henan Province until the outbreak of the Second Sino-Japanese War and WWII.

World War II and Later 
During World War II he was Commander in Chief 20th Army Group from 1937 to 1941, concurrently commanding 32nd Corps until 1938. In 1939 he was made Deputy Commander in Chief 9th War Area and later the same year Deputy Commander in Chief 6th War Area. In 1940 he was made the Commander in Chief of the 6th War Area.

Following 30 years of war as field commander he was appointed Director of the Main Office of the National Military Council from 1940 to 1944. In 1941 he was given the additional duty of Director of the Foreign Affairs Bureau, National Military Council both of which he held till 1944.

From 1944 to the end of the war he was the Chinese Military attaché in Washington D.C. 

In 1943, he attended the Cairo Conference with Generalissimo Chiang Kai Shek between US, Great Britain and China about the Pacific Theater.  Burma was an important issue of the time as a prelude to landings in coastal China and ultimately in Japan.  Participants included General Marshall, General Stilwell and Lord Mountbatten .  Shang Zhen and General 周至柔 represented the Chinese military.  The result was a coordinated proceed 3 nation Burma campaign. This was critical to the supply routes to inner China.  In 1944 he similarly attended the Dumbarton Oaks conference to charter the United Nations.  Despite Soviet opposition many Chinese requirements.

His reports and activity on behalf of his country earned enough respect from President Truman to a White House reception, even though not all requests were accepted.  After the war in 1946, he was appointed Head of Chinese Military Mission in Japan, the official Chinese delegate to the Allied Council.

He resigned in March, 1949, retiring to Japan, keeping in touch with several other Chinese Mission members including Zhu Shiming, Zhang Fengju and others..  Died May 15, 1978.

References

Sources 
 中国抗战正向战场作战记 China’s Anti-Japanese War Combat Operations
 Guo Rugui, editor-in-chief Huang Yuzhang
 Jiangsu People's Publishing House
 Date published : 2005-7-1
 
 Hsu Long-hsuen and Chang Ming-kai, History of The Sino-Japanese War (1937–1945) 2nd Ed.,1971. Translated by Wen Ha-hsiung, Chung Wu Publishing; 33, 140th Lane, Tung-hwa Street, Taipei, Taiwan Republic of China.

1887 births
1978 deaths
National Revolutionary Army generals from Hebei
People of the Central Plains War
Chinese anti-communists
Republic of China politicians from Hebei
Politicians from Langfang